Food for Scandal is a 1920 American comedy drama film directed by James Cruze and written by Edith Kennedy. The film stars Wanda Hawley, Harrison Ford, Ethel Grey Terry, Margaret McWade, Minnie Devereaux, and Juan de la Cruz. The film was released on September 12, 1920, by Realart Pictures Corporation.

Cast         
Wanda Hawley as Sylvia Figueroa
Harrison Ford as Watt Dinwiile
Ethel Grey Terry as Nancy Horner 
Margaret McWade as Señora Maria Serra
Minnie Devereaux as Paola
Juan de la Cruz as Count Tizapitti
Sidney Bracey as Padre
Lester Cuneo as Jack Horner

References

External links

 

1920 films
1920s English-language films
Silent American comedy-drama films
1920 comedy-drama films
Films directed by James Cruze
American silent feature films
American black-and-white films
1920s American films